Luis Ernesto José (born October 11, 1975 in La Romana, Dominican Republic) is a lightweight boxer from the Dominican Republic, who won a bronze medal at the 1995 Pan American Games in Mar del Plata, Argentina. He made his professional debut on May 14, 2000.

References
 

1975 births
Living people
Lightweight boxers
Boxers at the 1995 Pan American Games
People from La Romana, Dominican Republic
Dominican Republic male boxers
Pan American Games bronze medalists for the Dominican Republic
Pan American Games medalists in boxing
Medalists at the 1995 Pan American Games